Samayamaayilla Polum is a 1978 Indian Malayalam film, produced by Brian Joseph. The film stars Chinni Prakash, Urmila, Ambika and K. P. Ummer in the lead roles. The film has musical score and songs composed by Salil Chowdhary.

Cast
 Chinni Prakash as Rajan
 Urmila as Lakshmi
 Ambika as Latha
 K. P. Ummer as Krishnadas
 Mala Aravindan as KK Kanichukulangara
 Kaviyoor Ponnamma as Savithri
 Mallika Sukumaran as Mayavathi
 Kuthiravattam Pappu as Edakoodam Chanchalakshan
Veeran as Chandikunju
Thrissur Elsy as Meenakshi/Rajan's mother

Soundtrack
The music was composed by Salil Chowdhary and the lyrics were written by O. N. V. Kurup.

References

External links
 

1978 films
1970s Malayalam-language films
Films scored by Salil Chowdhury